Blaine Peffley (born August 25, 1984 in Lebanon, Pennsylvania) is an American professional golfer currently playing on the NGA Hooters Tour and the EGolf Professional Tour. Peffley began his college golf career at the University of Arizona and later transferred to the University of Maryland. Peffley plays out of Lebanon Country Club.

High school
He earned four letters at Cedar Crest High School for coach Fred Sherk. He was a three-year Lancaster-Lebanon League champion and two-year District III champion. Peffley won the 2002 Pennsylvania state championship after finishing fourth as a sophomore and second as a junior. He broke former All-American Jim Furyk's scoring record with a 138 in the process. He was the top-ranked junior player in the US and was a 2001 AJGA All-American. Peffley won three national events in 2001, including the AJGA Club Corp Junior Player's Championship. and the AJGA Marsh Junior Championship. He was 2001 Pennsylvania high school Player of the Year. Peffley was an all-state selection in 2000 and 2001. A five-time all-league selection, Peffley also qualified for the 2000 United States Junior Championship. He won the Kiwanis Award for community service, academics and athletics. He was team captain as a junior and senior.

Professional wins
NGA Hooters Tour I-40 Hooters Tour Open at Rock Barn Presented by Terry Moore Ford Country Monday March 9, 2009 - Sunday March 15, 2009 Rock Barn Golf & Spa Conover, NC
NGA Hooters Tour Loma Linda Classic presented by Zimmer Radio Group Monday June 11, 2007 - Sunday June 17, 2007 Loma Linda Resort Joplin, MO

Notable amateur wins
2004 Pennsylvania State Amateur Champion
2001-2002 PIAA State Champion Golf
AJGA Club Corp Junior Players Championship

References

American male golfers
Arizona Wildcats men's golfers
Maryland Terrapins men's golfers
Golfers from Pennsylvania
1984 births
Living people